Christ Church is a historic church located near Florence, Florence County, South Carolina.  It was constructed in 1859, and is a Carpenter Gothic-style church building. It has a cruciform plan, with board and batten construction, a steeply pitched roof with simple wooden brackets, and pointed-arched windows and doors. It is part of the Anglican Diocese of South Carolina in the Anglican Church in North America.

It was listed on the National Register of Historic Places in 1978.

References

Anglican Church in North America church buildings in the United States
Churches on the National Register of Historic Places in South Carolina
Carpenter Gothic church buildings in South Carolina
Churches completed in 1859
19th-century Episcopal church buildings
National Register of Historic Places in Florence County, South Carolina
Buildings and structures in Florence, South Carolina
Former Episcopal church buildings in South Carolina
Anglican realignment congregations